Kazim Mirheydar oghlu Ismayilov ( November 22, 1905 — March 21, 1981) was a Soviet political figure, First Secretary of the Nakhchivan Regional Committee of the Communist Party of the Azerbaijan, First Secretary of the Agdash and Salyan District Party Committees.

Biography 
Kazim Ismayilov was born on November 22, 1905, in Baskal settlement. In 1922 he volunteered for the army. After his discharge from the army in 1924, K. Ismayilov worked as an assistant locksmith in mechanical workshops in Baku. In the following years he became the second secretary of the Central Committee of the Komsomol of Azerbaijan and the first secretary of the Nakhchivan regional party committee.

From the first days of the Great Patriotic War, Kazim Ismayilov joined the fighting army, was the chief of the political department of the 402nd, 72nd, 378th and 39th Rifle Divisions, and took part in the clashes with the Germans. After his discharge from the army in 1945, Kazim Ismayilov returned to party work - first secretary of the Agdash and Salyan district party committees, head of the department of administrative bodies of the Azerbaijan Communist Party. He was a deputy of the Supreme Soviet of the USSR, the Supreme Soviet of Azerbaijan, the Supreme Soviet of the Nakhchivan Autonomous Republic.

Kazim Ismayilov died on March 21, 1981. He was the father of the First Secretary of State of the Republic of Azerbaijan Tofig Ismayilov.

Awards 
Order of Lenin (2 times) — April 27, 1940
Order of the Badge of Honour
Order of the Red Banner of Labour
Order of the Patriotic War (1st and 2nd class)

References

Literature 
 Филиппов С. Территориальные руководители ВКП(б) в 1934—1939 гг. Справочник. — Москва, РОССПЭН, 2016.

1905 births
1981 deaths
People from Baku Governorate
First convocation members of the Supreme Soviet of the Soviet Union
Recipients of the Order of Lenin
Recipients of the Order of the Red Banner of Labour